It's All a Long Goodbye is an On Broken Wings second release on Eulogy Recordings. There was a video shot for "Frozen Over". The album features many tracks that are re-recorded versions of songs from Some Of Us May Never See The World.

Track listing

"Suffer" - 1:48
"Pushing Up Daisies" - 3:00
"More Than Life" - 2:58
"I Do My Crosswords in Pen" - 3:36
"Frozen Over" - 2:31
"Listless" - 3:18
"Tongue in Teeth" - 3:06
"Nothing New" - 2:23
"Hell or High Water" - 2:56
"Deadpool" - 2:40
"Ashes and Snow" - 4:09

Line up

 Jonathan Blake - Vocals
 Mike McMillen - Guitar
 Burke Medeiros - Guitar
 Jerome McBride - Bass
 Kevin Garvin - Drums

Additional personnel

 Layout And Design - Ian Rowan and Pete Salpeas
 Layout And Deesign Concept - Jonathan Blake
 Recorded And Mixed - Tim Gilles, Chris, Erin Farley and Arun Venkatesh at Big Blue Meenie Recording Studio
 Mastering - Allan Duches at West West Side

References

On Broken Wings albums
2005 albums